

This is a list of Florida State Seminoles in the NFL Draft. Florida State has had a draft pick in thirty-nine consecutive drafts.

Drafts
Key

1951

1952

1954

1955

1956

1958

1961

1962

1964

1966

1967

1968

1969

1970

1971

1972

1973

1974

1975

1976

1977

1978

1979

1980

1981

1982

1984

1985

1986

1987

1988

1989

1990

1991

1992

1993

1994

1995

1996

1997

1998

1999

2000

2001

2002

2003

2004

2005

2006

2007

2008

2009

2010

2011

2012

2013

2014

2015

2016

2017

2018

2019

2020

2021

2022

Pro Football Hall of Fame inductees

References

External links
All-Time Draft Picks
All-Time First Round Draft Picks

Florida State

Florida State Seminoles NFL Draft